Sohl is a surname. Notable people with the surname include:

Bob Sohl (1928–2001), American swimmer
Jerry Sohl (1913–2002), American writer and scriptwriter
Richard Sohl (1953–1990), American pianist, songwriter, and arranger

Fictional characters:
Nick Sohl, character in Known Space